Ocellularia aptrootiana is a species of corticolous lichen in the family Graphidaceae. Found in Sri Lanka, it was formally described as a new species in 2014 by lichenologists Gothamie Weerakoon, Robert Lücking, and Helge Thorsten Lumbsch. Here, in a low-altitude, dry, semi-evergreen forest, it was found growing around a water tank. The specific epithet aptrootiana honours Dutch lichenologist André Aptroot, "for his important contributions to tropical lichenology and his help with the research by the first author". Ocellularia aptrootiana has a grey, smooth to uneven or cracked thallus up to convert  in diameter. The ascospores are hyaline, ellipsoid in shape, contain seven septa, and measure 20–25 by 6–7 μm. Secondary chemicals present in the lichen include psoromic acid, subpsoromic acid, and 2’-O-demethylpsoromic acids.

See also
 List of Ocellularia species

References

aptrootiana
Lichen species
Lichens of Sri Lanka
Lichens described in 2014
Taxa named by Helge Thorsten Lumbsch
Taxa named by Robert Lücking
Taxa named by Gothamie Weerakoon